USS Crocus was a steamer acquired by the Union Navy during the American Civil War.

Crocus was planned to be used by the Union Navy as a gunboat, to patrol navigable waterways of the Confederacy to prevent the South from trading with other countries.

Service history 

Crocus, a screw steamer, was built in 1862 at New York City as Solomon Thomas. She was purchased 31 July 1863 from C. W. Copeland and renamed Crocus. Her career was one of the shortest in the Navy. Clearing New York City 14 August 1863 under the command of Acting Ensign J. L. Winton, Crocus ran aground on Bodie's Island, North Carolina, 17 August and was totally wrecked. All of her crew were saved.

References 

Ships of the Union Navy
Ships built in New York City
Steamships of the United States Navy
Gunboats of the United States Navy
American Civil War patrol vessels of the United States
1862 ships
Shipwrecks of the American Civil War
Shipwrecks of the Carolina coast
Maritime incidents in August 1863